Phil Oreskovic (pronounced Or-esh-ko-vich; born January 26, 1987) is a Canadian former professional ice hockey defenceman.

Playing career
As a youth, Oreskovic played in the 2001 Quebec International Pee-Wee Hockey Tournament with the Toronto Marlboros minor ice hockey team.

Oreskovic was drafted 82nd overall in the 2005 NHL Entry Draft by the Toronto Maple Leafs. Phil played in the Ontario Hockey League with the Brampton Battalion and the Owen Sound Attack before turning professional at the end of the 2006–07 season with the Toronto Marlies of the American Hockey League.

On June 1, 2007, Oreskovic was signed by the Maple Leafs to a three-year entry level contract. He then started out the 2007–08 season with Columbia Inferno of the ECHL before making his way up to the Leafs main affiliate the Marlies.

Oreskovic started the 2008–09 season with the Marlies before being recalled by the Maple Leafs on March 9, 2009. Phil made his NHL debut with the Leafs on the same day, a 3-2 loss to the Ottawa Senators, and became the 400th ECHL player to reach the NHL. On March 24, 2009, Oreskovic scored his first NHL goal against José Théodore of the Washington Capitals in a 3-2 victory.

He spent the 2009–10 season in the AHL with the Toronto Marlies playing a career high 74 games, while scoring 2 goals and getting 7 assists. In the 2010 offseason, Oreskovic was not offered a contract extension by the Toronto Maple Leafs, thus being acquired as a free agent by the Washington Capitals. He signed a professional tryout contract (PTO) in September 2010 and is currently playing for the Capitals' AHL affiliate Hershey Bears.

Upon joining the Bears organization, Bears forward Johann Kroll was already wearing the uniform #4 and then goaltender Semyon Varlamov was already wearing the uniform #40 (at the time), therefore Oreskovic chose to wear the uniform #32. Oreskovic wore the uniform #4 with the Brampton Battalion, Owen Sound Attack, Columbia Inferno and the Toronto Marlies, and wore the uniform #40 with the Toronto Maple Leafs.

On August 6, 2013, Oreskovic re-signed to a one-year contract for a second season with the ECHL's Toledo Walleye but would leave the team after ten games into the season.

After a season abroad in the Elite Ice Hockey League with the Nottingham Panthers, Oreskovic returned to Canada, signing a one-year contract with the Brampton Beast of the Central Hockey League on September 4, 2014 (the CHL joined the ECHL in October). He was injured early in the 2014–15 season and would retire before the end of the season. He later joined the Beast as an assistant coach before resigning at the end of the season.

Personal
Oreskovic is a Croatian Canadian.  Phil's father was born in Croatia and emigrated to Canada in 1962 and he fluently speaks Croatian.

Career statistics

References

External links

1987 births
Brampton Battalion players
Brampton Beast players
Canadian ice hockey defencemen
Canadian people of Croatian descent
Columbia Inferno players
Hershey Bears players
Living people
Nottingham Panthers players
Owen Sound Attack players
South Carolina Stingrays players
Sportspeople from North York
Ice hockey people from Toronto
Toledo Walleye players
Toronto Maple Leafs draft picks
Toronto Maple Leafs players
Toronto Marlies players
Canadian expatriate ice hockey players in England